The 1923–24 season was the twenty-ninth season in which Dundee competed at a Scottish national level, playing in Division One, where they would finish in 5th place. Dundee would also compete in the Scottish Cup, where they were knocked out in the 2nd round by Raith Rovers. During this season, striker Dave Halliday would set the record for most goals scored by a Dundee player in a league campaign, topping the Scottish scoring charts with 38 goals, a total that remains a Dundee record to this day.

For the second straight year, Dundee would follow up their season with a footballing tour of Spain. They would get revenge over Barcelona and consolidate their success over Real Madrid by beating both, becoming the first club outside of Spain to defeat both at their respective home grounds.

Scottish Division One 

Statistics provided by Dee Archive.

League table

Scottish Cup 

Statistics provided by Dee Archive.

1924 Tour of Spain

Player Statistics 
Statistics provided by Dee Archive

|}

See also 

 List of Dundee F.C. seasons

References

External links 

 1919-20 Dundee season on Fitbastats

Dundee F.C. seasons
Dundee